Saanich Peninsula is located north of Victoria, British Columbia, Canada. It is bounded by Saanich Inlet on the west, Satellite Channel on the north, the small Colburne Passage on the northeast,  and Haro Strait on the east. The exact southern boundary of what is referred to as the "Saanich Peninsula" (or simply as "the Peninsula") is somewhat fluid in local parlance.

Surrounded by the Salish Sea, Saanich Peninsula is separated from Saltspring Island by Satellite Channel, Piers Island and Coal Island by Colburne Passage, and James Island by Cordova Passage in Haro Strait.

Name

Its name in the Saanich dialect, W̱SÁNEĆ, means "raised up" (when referring to people, that term means "emerging people").

Geography and climate
Lying in the rain shadow of both the Vancouver Island Ranges and the Olympic Mountains, Saanich Peninsula is the driest part of Vancouver Island. The driest recording station in the provincial capital city of Victoria averages only  of precipitation annually. Precipitation increases from east to west, and from south to north.

The natural flora of the region include mixed forests of Douglas fir, Western red cedar, hemlock, arbutus, Garry oak, and manzanita. The ground cover includes snowberry, Oregon grape, salal, sword fern, trillium, and fawn lily. The peninsula is characterized by rolling hills and numerous freshwater ponds and lakes. Notable natural features of Saanich Peninsula include Elk Lake, Beaver Lake, Mount Newton, Bear Hill, Tod Inlet, Mount Finlayson, Maltby Lake, Prospect Lake, Durrance Lake, and Mount Work. Many of these features are protected in regional and municipal parks.

Geology
Many different kinds of bedrock underlie the peninsula. Sandstone is common at the northern end. Granodiorite crops out in many northern and central areas. Amphibolite, diorite, gabbro and quartz diorite are common in the south. Smaller areas of andesite, basalt, chert, dacite and limestone are also found.

History
The region is the historical homeland of certain Coast Salish peoples. Several Indian Reserves are located on the peninsula, predominantly along the shore of Saanich Inlet. Early European settlers arrived in the mid-nineteenth century, pursuing mainly resource-based economic activities such as logging, fishing, and — most notably — agriculture. The peninsula is home to the oldest agricultural exhibition in Western Canada, the Saanich Fair, sponsored by the North and South Saanich Agricultural Society. In more recent decades, residential and commercial development has become widespread on the Peninsula, although provincial law protects much of the region's farmland from rezoning. The peninsula is also home to many wilderness parks, mostly on its southwest. The largest of these is Gowlland Tod Provincial Park.

Transportation
The peninsula is also the location of the Swartz Bay terminal of the BC Ferry Corporation, the Victoria International Airport at Patricia Bay, aka "Pat Bay", and the western terminal of the Washington State Ferries run through the San Juan Islands from Anacortes to Sidney. A small ferry on the west coast of the Peninsula connects Brentwood Bay to Mill Bay.

Cultural institutions
Just north of Elk Lake is the Dominion Astrophysical Observatory. Butchart Gardens is located just south of the town of Brentwood Bay, which was the original home of a long-established private school of the same name.

Governance
The following municipalities are located on the peninsula. They are part of Greater Victoria and member municipalities of the Capital Regional District/(CRD):

 Central Saanich (containing the villages of Brentwood Bay and Saanichton)
 Highlands
 North Saanich
 Saanich (its northern portions)
 Sidney

The Tsawout First Nation reserve and band office is located in Saanichton overlooking James Island on the east shore of the Peninsula; the Tsartlip First Nation is based on the west side of the peninsula north of Brentwood Bay; the Pauquachin First Nation is based between Mount Newton and Coles Bay on west side of the Peninsula; and the Tseycum First Nation is based on the NW of the Peninsula along the shores of Patricia Bay.

The rural community of Willis Point is also located on the peninsula, but is governed via the Juan de Fuca Electoral Area.

See also 
 Elk/Beaver Lake Regional Park
 Victoria and Sidney Railway

References

External links
A satellite image of the peninsula, from Google Local
The MyPeninsula Local Events Calendar

 
Peninsulas of British Columbia
Greater Victoria